The 1986 Tulane Green Wave football team was an American football team that represented Tulane University during the 1986 NCAA Division I-A football season as an independent. In their second year under head coach Mack Brown, the team compiled a 4–7 record.

Schedule

Roster

References

Tulane
Tulane Green Wave football seasons
Tulane Green Wave football